Rodolfo Pietro Filiberto Raffaello Guglielmi di Valentina d'Antonguolla (May 6, 1895 – August 23, 1926), known professionally as Rudolph Valentino and nicknamed The Latin Lover, was an Italian actor based in the United States who starred in several well-known silent films including The Four Horsemen of the Apocalypse, The Sheik, Blood and Sand, The Eagle, 
and The Son of the Sheik.

Valentino was a sex symbol of the 1920s, known in Hollywood as the "Latin Lover" (a title invented for him by Hollywood moguls), the "Great Lover", or simply Valentino. His early death at the age of 31 caused mass hysteria among his fans, further cementing his place in early cinematic history as a cultural film icon.

Early life

Childhood and emigration

Valentino was born in Castellaneta, Apulia, and named Rodolfo Pietro Filiberto Raffaello Guglielmi di Valentina d'Antonguella. His father, Giovanni Antonio Giuseppe Fedele Guglielmi di Valentina d'Antonguella, was an Italian from Martina Franca, Apulia; he was a captain of cavalry in the Italian Army, later a veterinarian, who died of malaria when Rodolfo was 11. His mother, Marie Berthe Gabrielle Barbin (1856–1918), was French with Torinese ancestry (the original family name was Barbini, gallicized to Barbin later on), born in Lure in Franche-Comté. She was lady-in-waiting to a local marquess. Valentino had an older brother, Alberto (1892–1981), a younger sister, Maria, and an older sister, Beatrice, who had died in infancy.

As a child, Rodolfo was indulged because of his exceptional looks and his playful personality. His mother coddled him, while his father disapproved of him. He did poorly in school and was eventually enrolled in agricultural school in Genoa, where he earned a certificate.

After living in Paris in 1912, he soon returned to Italy. Unable to secure employment, he departed for the United States in 1913. He was processed at Ellis Island at age 18 on December 23, 1913. Although he found unparalleled fame and success in America, Valentino never filed the necessary papers for naturalization, and so retained his Italian citizenship.

New York

Arriving in New York City, he supported himself with odd jobs such as busing tables in restaurants and gardening. Valentino once worked as a bus boy at Murray's on 42nd Street and was well liked, but didn't do a good job and was fired. While he was living on the streets, Valentino would occasionally come back to Murray's for lunch and the staff would slip him some food. Around 1914, restaurateur Joe Pani who owned Castles-by-the-Sea, the Colony, and the Woodmansten Inn was the first to hire Rudolph to dance the tango with Joan Sawyer for $50 per week. Eventually, he found work as a taxi dancer at Maxim's Restaurant-Cabaret. Among the other dancers at Maxim's were several displaced members of European nobility, for whom a premium demand existed. 

Valentino eventually befriended Chilean heiress Blanca de Saulles, who was unhappily married to businessman John de Saulles, with whom she had a son. Whether Blanca and Valentino actually had a romantic relationship is unknown, but when the de Saulles divorced, Valentino took the stand to support Blanca de Saulles's claims of infidelity on her husband's part. Following the divorce, John de Saulles reportedly used his political connections to have Valentino arrested, along with a Mrs. Thyme, a known madam, on some unspecified vice charges. The evidence was flimsy at best, and after a few days in jail, Valentino's bail was lowered from $10,000 to $1,500.

Following the well-publicized trial and subsequent scandal, Valentino could not find employment. Shortly after the trial, Blanca de Saulles fatally shot her ex-husband during a custody dispute over their son. Fearful of being called in as a witness in another sensational trial, Valentino left town and joined a traveling musical that led him to the West Coast.

Film career

Before fame

In 1917, Valentino joined an operetta company that traveled to Utah, where it disbanded. He then joined an Al Jolson production of Robinson Crusoe, Jr. which was travelling to Los Angeles. By fall, he was in San Francisco with a bit part in a theatrical production of Nobody Home. While in town, Valentino met actor Norman Kerry, who convinced him to try a career in cinema, which was still in the silent film era.

Valentino and Kerry moved back to Los Angeles and became roommates at the Alexandria Hotel. He continued dancing, teaching dance, and building up a following that included older female clientele who would let him borrow their luxury cars. At one point after the United States entered World War I, both Kerry and Valentino tried to get into the Canadian Air Force to fly and fight in France.

With his dancing success, Valentino found a room of his own on Sunset Boulevard and began actively seeking screen roles. His first part was as an extra in the film Alimony, moving on to small parts in several films. Despite his best efforts, he was typically cast as a "heavy" (villain) or gangster. At the time, the archetypal major male star was Wallace Reid, with a fair complexion, light eyes, and an All-American look, with Valentino the opposite, eventually supplanting Sessue Hayakawa as Hollywood's most popular "exotic" male lead.

By 1919, he had carved out a career in bit parts. It was a bit part as a "cabaret parasite" in the drama Eyes of Youth, starring Clara Kimball Young, that caught the attention of screenwriter June Mathis, who thought he would be perfect for her next movie. Young would later say it was she and Lewis J. Selznick who discovered him, and that they were disappointed when Valentino accepted a lucrative offer at Metro.

He appeared as second lead in The Delicious Little Devil (1919) with star Mae Murray. In 1919, Valentino impulsively married actress Jean Acker. Their marriage was purportedly never consummated.

Acting

Displeased with playing "heavies", Valentino briefly entertained the idea of returning to New York permanently. He returned for a visit in 1917, staying with friends in Greenwich Village, eventually settling in Bayside, Queens. There he met Paul Ivano, who would greatly help his career.

While traveling to Palm Springs, California, to film Stolen Moments, Valentino read the novel The Four Horsemen of the Apocalypse by Vicente Blasco Ibáñez. Seeking out a trade paper, he discovered that Metro had bought the film rights to the story. In New York, he sought out Metro's office, only to find June Mathis had been trying to find him. She cast him in the role of Julio Desnoyers. For the director, Mathis had chosen Rex Ingram, with whom Valentino did not get along, leading Mathis to play the role of peacekeeper between the two.

The Four Horsemen of the Apocalypse was released in 1921 and became a commercial and critical success. It was one of the first films to make $1,000,000 at the box office, the sixth-highest grossing silent film ever.

Metro Pictures seemed unwilling to acknowledge that it had made a star. Most likely due to Rex Ingram's lack of faith in him, the studio refused to give him a raise beyond the $350 a week he had made for Four Horsemen. For his follow-up film, they forced him into a bit part in a B-film called Uncharted Seas. On this film, Valentino met his second wife, Natacha Rambova. That same year, Valentino's legal wife, Jean Acker, successfully sued for divorce.

Rambova, Mathis, Ivano, and Valentino began work on the Alla Nazimova film Camille. Valentino was cast in the role of Armand, Nazimova's love interest. The film, mostly under the control of Rambova and Nazimova, was considered too avant garde by critics and the public.

Valentino's final film for Metro was the Mathis-penned The Conquering Power. The film received critical acclaim and did well at the box office. After the film's release, Valentino made a trip to New York, where he met with several French producers. Yearning for Europe, better pay, and more respect, Valentino returned and promptly quit Metro.

The Sheik

After quitting Metro, Valentino took up with Famous Players-Lasky, forerunner of the present-day Paramount Pictures, a studio known for films that were more commercially focused. Mathis soon joined him, angering both Ivano and Rambova.

Jesse L. Lasky intended to capitalize on the star power of Valentino, and cast him in a role that solidified his reputation as the "Latin lover". In The Sheik (1921), Valentino played the starring role of Sheik Ahmed Ben Hassan. The film was a major success and defined not only his career but his image and legacy. Valentino tried to distance the character from a stereotypical portrayal of an Arab man. Asked if Lady Diana (his love interest) would have fallen for a "savage" in real life, Valentino replied, "People are not savages because they have dark skins. The Arabian civilization is one of the oldest in the world ... the Arabs are dignified and keen-brained."

Famous Players produced four more feature-length films over the next 15 months. His leading role in Moran of the Lady Letty was of a typical Douglas Fairbanks nature; however, to capitalize on Valentino's bankability, his character was given a Spanish name and ancestry. The film received mixed reviews, but was still a hit with audiences.

In November 1921, Valentino starred alongside Gloria Swanson in Beyond the Rocks. The film contained lavish sets and extravagant costumes, though Photoplay magazine said the film was "a little unreal and hectic." Released in 1922, the film was a critical disappointment. Years after its release, Beyond the Rocks was thought to be lost, save for a one-minute portion. But in 2002, the film was discovered by the Netherlands Film Museum. The restored version was released on DVD in 2006.

In 1922, Valentino began work on another Mathis-penned film, Blood and Sand. He played the lead—bullfighter Juan Gallardo—and co-starred with Lila Lee and Nita Naldi. Initially believing the film would be shot in Spain, Valentino was upset to learn that the studio planned on shooting on a Hollywood back lot. He was further irritated by changes in production, including a director of whom he did not approve.

After finishing the film, Valentino married Rambova, which led to a bigamy trial, as he had been divorced from his first wife, Jean Acker, for less than a full year, as required by California law at the time. The trial was a sensation and the pair was forced to have their marriage annulled and separated for a year. Despite the trial, the film was still a success, with critics calling it a masterpiece on par with Broken Blossoms and Four Horsemen. Blood and Sand became one of the four top-grossing movies of 1922, breaking attendance records, and grossing $37,400 at the Rivoli Theatre alone. Valentino considered this one of his best films.

During his forced break from Rambova, the pair began working separately on the Mathis-penned The Young Rajah. Only fragments of this film, recovered in 2005, still remain. The film did not live up to expectations and underperformed at the box office. Valentino felt he had underperformed in the film, being upset over his separation with Rambova. Missing Rambova, Valentino returned to New York after the release of The Young Rajah. They were spotted and followed by reporters constantly. During this time, Valentino began to contemplate not returning to Famous Players, although Jesse Lasky already had his next picture, The Spanish Cavalier, in preparation. After speaking with Rambova and his lawyer Arthur Butler Graham, Valentino declared a 'one-man strike' against Famous Players.

Strike against Famous Players
Valentino went on strike for financial reasons. At the time of his lawsuit against the studio, he was earning $1,250 per week, with an increase to $3,000 after three years. This was $7,000 per week less than Mary Pickford made in 1916. He was also upset over the broken promise of filming Blood and Sand in Spain, and the failure to shoot the next proposed film in either Spain or at least New York. Valentino had hoped while filming in Europe he could see his family, whom he had not seen in 10 years.

In September 1922, he refused to accept paychecks from Famous Players until the dispute was solved, although he owed them money he had spent to pay off Jean Acker. Angered, Famous Players, in turn, filed suit against him.

Valentino did not back down, and Famous Players realized how much they stood to lose. In trouble after shelving Roscoe Arbuckle pictures, the studio tried to settle by upping his salary from $1,250 to $7,000 a week. Variety erroneously announced the salary increase as a "new contract" before news of the lawsuit was released, and Valentino angrily rejected the offer.

Valentino went on to claim that artistic control was more of an issue than the money. He wrote an open letter to Photoplay magazine, titled "Open Letter to the American Public", where he argued his case, although the average American had trouble sympathizing, as most made $2,000 a year. Famous Players made their own public statements deeming him more trouble than he was worth (the divorce, bigamy trials, debts) and that he was temperamental, almost diva-like. They claimed to have done all they could and that they had made him a real star.

Other studios began courting him. Joseph Schenck was interested in casting his wife, Norma Talmadge, opposite Valentino in a version of Romeo and Juliet. June Mathis had moved to Goldwyn Pictures, where she was in charge of the Ben-Hur project, and interested in casting Valentino in the film. However, Famous Players exercised its option to extend his contract, preventing him from accepting any employment other than with the studio. By this point, Valentino was about $80,000 in debt. He filed an appeal, a portion of which was granted. Although he was still not allowed to work as an actor, he could accept other types of employment.

Mineralava Dance Tour
In late 1922, Valentino met George Ullman, who soon became his manager. Ullman had previously worked with Mineralava Beauty Clay Company, and convinced them that Valentino would be perfect as a spokesman with his legions of female fans.

The tour was a tremendous success, with Valentino and Rambova performing in 88 cities in the United States and Canada. In addition to the tour, Valentino also sponsored Mineralava beauty products and judged Mineralava-sponsored beauty contests. One beauty contest was filmed by a young David O. Selznick, who titled it Rudolph Valentino and his 88 Beauties.

Return to films

Valentino returned to the United States in reply to an offer from Ritz-Carlton Pictures (working through Famous Players), which included $7,500 a week, creative control, and filming in New York. Rambova negotiated a two-picture deal with Famous Players and four pictures for Ritz-Carlton. He accepted, turning down an offer to film an Italian production of Quo Vadis in Italy.

The first film under the new contract was Monsieur Beaucaire, wherein Valentino played the lead, the Duke of Chartres. The film did poorly and American audiences found it "effeminate". The failure of the film, under Rambova's control, is often seen as proof of her controlling nature and later caused her to be barred from Valentino sets. Valentino made one final movie for Famous Players. In 1924, he starred in A Sainted Devil, now one of his lost films. It had lavish costumes, but apparently a weak story. It opened to strong sales, but soon dropped off in attendance and ended up as another disappointment.

With his contract fulfilled, Valentino was released from Famous Players, but was still obligated to Ritz-Carlton for four films. His next film was a pet project titled The Hooded Falcon. The production was beset with problems from the start, beginning with the script written by June Mathis. The Valentinos were dissatisfied with Mathis's version and requested that it be rewritten. Mathis took it as a great insult and did not speak to Valentino for almost two years. While Rambova worked designing costumes and rewriting the script for Falcon, Valentino was persuaded to film Cobra with Nita Naldi. He agreed only on condition that it not be released until after The Hooded Falcon debuted.

After filming Cobra, the cast of The Hooded Falcon sailed for France to be fitted for costumes. After three months, they returned to the United States, where Valentino's new beard, which he had grown for the film, caused a sensation. "I opened once a paper and I tell you what was in. It was Rudolph Valentino with a beard upon his chin. My heart stopped off from beating and I fainted dead away, and I never want to come to life until the judgement day," was soon printed in Photoplay. The cast and crew left for Hollywood to begin preparations for the film, but much of the budget was taken up during preproduction. Due to the Valentinos' lavish spending on costumes and sets, Ritz-Carlton terminated the deal with the couple, effectively ending Valentino's contract with them.

United Artists

During the filming of Monsieur Beaucaire, both Charlie Chaplin and Douglas Fairbanks approached Valentino privately, due to his contract with Ritz-Carlton, about joining with United Artists. Valentino's contract with United Artists provided $10,000 a week for only three pictures a year, plus a percentage of his films. The contract excluded Rambova from production of his films and the film set. Valentino's acceptance of the terms caused a major rift in his marriage to Rambova. George Ullman, who had negotiated the contract with United Artists, offered Rambova $30,000 to finance a film of her own. It became her only film, titled What Price Beauty? and starred Myrna Loy.

Valentino chose his first UA project, The Eagle. With the marriage under strain, Valentino began shooting and Rambova announced that she needed a "marital vacation". During the filming of The Eagle, rumors of an affair with co-star Vilma Bánky were reported and ultimately denied by both Bánky and Valentino. The film opened to positive reviews, but a moderate box office.

For the film's release, Valentino travelled to London, staying there and in France, spending money with abandon while his divorce took place. Quite some time elapsed before he made another film, The Son of the Sheik, despite his hatred of the sheik image. The film began shooting in February 1926, with Valentino given his choice of director, and pairing him again with Vilma Bánky. The film used the authentic costumes he bought abroad and allowed him to play a dual role. Valentino was ill during production, but he needed the money to pay his many debts. The film opened on July 9, 1926, to great fanfare. During the premiere, Valentino was reconciled with Mathis; the two had not spoken in almost two years.

Public image
Dating back to the de Saulles trial in New York, during which his masculinity had been questioned in print, Valentino had been very sensitive about his public perception. Women loved him and thought him the epitome of romance. 

However, American men were less impressed, walking out of his movies in disgust. 
With the Fairbanks type being the epitome of manhood, Valentino was seen as a threat to the "All American" man. One man, asked in a street interview in 1922 what he thought of Valentino, replied, "Many other men desire to be another Douglas Fairbanks. But Valentino? I wonder ..." 
Women in the same interview found Valentino "triumphantly seductive. Puts the love-making of the average husband or sweetheart into discard as tame, flat, and unimpassioned." 

Men may have wanted to act like Fairbanks, but they copied Valentino's look. A man with perfectly greased-back hair was called a "Vaselino". 
Some journalists were still calling his masculinity into question, going on at length about his pomaded hair, his dandyish clothing, his treatment of women, his views on women, and whether he was effeminate or not. 
Valentino hated these stories and was known to carry clippings of the newspaper articles around with him and criticize them.

In July 1926, the Chicago Tribune reported that a vending machine dispensing pink talcum powder (face powder) had appeared in an upscale hotel's men's washroom. An editorial that followed used the story to protest the feminization of American men, and blamed the talcum powder on Valentino and his films. The piece infuriated Valentino and he challenged the writer to a boxing match, since dueling was illegal. Neither challenge was answered. 

Shortly afterward, Valentino met with journalist H. L. Mencken for advice on how best to deal with the incident. Mencken advised Valentino to "let the dreadful farce roll along to exhaustion," but Valentino insisted the editorial was "infamous". 

Mencken found Valentino to be likable and gentlemanly and wrote sympathetically of him in an article published in The Baltimore Sun a week after Valentino's death:

 
 
After Valentino challenged the Tribune's anonymous writer to a boxing match, the New York Evening Journal boxing writer, Frank O'Neill, volunteered to fight in his place. Valentino won the bout, which took place on the roof of New York's Ambassador Hotel.
 
Heavyweight champion Jack Dempsey, who trained Valentino and other Hollywood notables of the era in boxing, said of him: "He was the most virile and masculine of men. The women were like flies to a honeypot. He could never shake them off, anywhere he went. What a lovely, lucky guy.".
 
Valentino's sex symbol status and his untimely death were a biographical part in John Dos Passos's The Big Money in the U.S.A. trilogy. His title was the Adagio Dancer.

Other ventures

In 1923, Valentino published a book of poetry titled Day Dreams. He later serialized events in various magazines. With Liberty magazine, he wrote a series entitled, "How You Can Keep Fit" in 1923. "My Life Story" was serialized in Photoplay during his dance tour. The March issue was one of the best-selling ever for the magazine. He followed that with "My Private Diary", serialized in Movie Weekly magazine. Most of the serials were later published as books after his death.

Valentino was fascinated with every part of movie-making. During production on a Mae Murray film, he spent time studying the director's plans. He craved authenticity and wished to shoot on location, finally forming his own production company, Rudolph Valentino Productions, in 1925. Valentino, George Ullman, and Beatrice Ullman were the incorporators.

On May 14, 1923, while in New York City, Valentino made his only two vocal recordings for Brunswick Records; "Kashmiri Song" (The Sheik) and "El Relicario" (Blood and Sand). The recordings were not released until after Valentino's death by the Celebrity Recording Company; Brunswick did not release them because Valentino's English/Spanish pronunciation was subpar.

Valentino was one of the first in Hollywood to offer an award for artistic accomplishments in films; the Academy Awards later followed suit. In 1925, he gave out his only medal to John Barrymore for his performance in Beau Brummel. The award, named the Rudolph Valentino Medal, required the agreement of Valentino, two judges, and the votes of 75 critics. Everyone other than Valentino himself was eligible.

Personal life
Valentino once told gossip columnist Louella Parsons that: "The women I love don't love me. The others don't matter". He claims that despite his success as a sex symbol, in his personal love life he never achieved happiness.
 
In 1919—just before the rise of his career—Valentino impulsively married actress Jean Acker, who was involved with actresses Grace Darmond and Alla Nazimova. Acker became involved with Valentino in part to remove herself from the lesbian love triangle, quickly regretted the marriage, and locked Valentino out of their room on their wedding night. The couple separated soon after, and the marriage was never consummated. The couple remained legally married until 1921, when Acker sued Valentino for divorce, citing desertion. The divorce was granted, with Acker receiving alimony. She and Valentino eventually renewed their friendship, and remained friends until his death.

Valentino first met Winifred Shaughnessy, known by her stage name, Natacha Rambova—an American silent film costume and set designer, art director, and protégée of Nazimova—on the set of Uncharted Seas in 1921. The two worked together on the Nazimova production of Camille, by which time they were romantically involved. They married on May 13, 1922, in Mexicali, Mexico, which resulted in Valentino's arrest for bigamy, since he had not been divorced for a full year, as required by California law at the time. Days passed and his studio at the time, Famous Players-Lasky, refused to post bail. Eventually, a few friends were able to post the cash bail. He was also investigated for a possible violation of the Mann Act.

Having to wait the year or face the possibility of being arrested again, Rambova and Valentino lived in separate apartments in New York City, each with their own roommates. On March 14, 1923, they legally remarried at the Lake County Court House in Crown Point, Indiana.

Many of Valentino's friends disliked Rambova and found her controlling. During his relationship with her, he lost many friends and business associates, including June Mathis. Towards the end of their marriage, Rambova was banned from his sets by contract. Valentino and Rambova divorced in 1925. The end of the marriage was bitter, with Valentino bequeathing Rambova one dollar in his will.

From the time he died in 1926 until the 1960s, Valentino's sexuality was not generally questioned in print. At least four books, including the notoriously libelous Hollywood Babylon, suggested that he may have been gay despite his marriage to Rambova.

For some, the marriages to Acker and Rambova, as well as the relationship with Pola Negri, add to the suspicion that Valentino was gay and that these were "lavender marriages".

Such books gave rise to claims that Valentino had a relationship with Ramón Novarro, despite Novarro stating they barely knew each other. Hollywood Babylon recounts a story that Valentino had given Novarro an art deco dildo as a gift, which was found stuffed in his throat at the time of his murder. No such gift existed.
These books also gave rise to claims that he may have had relationships with both roommates Paul Ivano and Douglas Gerrad, as well as Norman Kerry, and openly gay French theatre director and poet Jacques Hébertot. However, Ivano maintained that it was untrue and both he and Valentino were heterosexual. Biographers Emily Leider and Allan Ellenberger generally agree that he was most likely straight.

There was further supposed evidence that Valentino was gay; documents in the estate of the late author Samuel Steward indicated that Valentino and Steward were sexual partners. However, evidence found in Steward's claim was subsequently found to be false, as Valentino was in New York on the date Steward claimed a sexual encounter occurred in Ohio.

Shortly before his death, Valentino was dating Ziegfeld Follies showgirl Marion Wilson Benda while he was also involved in a relationship with actress Pola Negri. Upon his death, Negri made a scene at his funeral, claiming they had been engaged, in spite of the fact that Valentino had never mentioned this engagement to anyone himself.

Death

On August 15, 1926, Valentino collapsed at the Hotel Ambassador on Park Avenue in Manhattan. He was hospitalized at the New York Polyclinic Hospital. Following an examination, he was diagnosed with appendicitis and gastric ulcers, and surgery was performed immediately. (His condition would eventually be referred to as "Valentino's syndrome"—perforated ulcers mimicking appendicitis.) After surgery, Valentino developed peritonitis. On August 18, his doctors were optimistic about his prognosis. The media were told that unless Valentino's condition deteriorated, no updates would be given. However, his condition worsened on August 21. He was stricken with a severe relapse of pleuritis, which developed rapidly in his left lung due to his weakened condition. The doctors realized that Valentino was going to die, but as was common at the time, chose to withhold this information. Valentino reportedly believed that he would recover. During the early hours of Monday, August 23, Valentino was briefly conscious and chatted with his doctors about his future, but soon lapsed into a coma. He died a few hours later at the age of 31. Following Valentino's death, doctors who treated him later confirmed that the actor had contracted sepsis, an overwhelming infection.

Funeral
An estimated 100,000 people lined the streets of Manhattan to pay their respects at his funeral, handled by the Frank Campbell Funeral Home. Suicides of despondent fans were reported. Windows were smashed as fans tried to get in and an all-day riot erupted on August 24. Over 100 mounted officers and NYPD's Police Reserve were used to restore order. A phalanx of officers lined the streets for the remainder of the viewing. Polish actress Pola Negri, claiming to be Valentino's fiancée, collapsed in hysterics while standing over the coffin, and Campbell hired four actors to impersonate a Fascist Blackshirt honor guard, purportedly sent by Benito Mussolini. Media reports that the body on display in the main salon was not Valentino but a decoy were continually denied by Campbell.

Valentino's funeral mass in Manhattan was held on Monday, August 30 at Saint Malachy's Roman Catholic Church, often called "The Actor's Chapel", as it is located on West 49th Street in the Broadway theater district, and has a long association with show-business figures.

After Valentino's remains were taken by train from New York to California, a second funeral was held on the West Coast, at the Catholic Church of the Good Shepherd in Beverly Hills. Valentino had no final burial arrangements and his friend June Mathis arranged a temporary solution when she offered a crypt that she had purchased for the husband whom she had since divorced. Coincidentally, she died the following year and was interred in the adjoining crypt that she had purchased for herself; Valentino was never moved to a new location and he remained in the crypt next to Mathis. The two are still interred side by side at Hollywood Forever Cemetery (originally Hollywood Memorial Park Cemetery) in Hollywood, California.

Estate
Valentino left his estate to his brother, sister, and Rambova's aunt Teresa Werner, who was left the share originally bequeathed to Rambova. His Beverly Hills mansion, Falcon Lair, was later owned by heiress Doris Duke. Duke died there in 1993. The home was later sold and underwent major renovations. The main building of the estate was razed in 2006, and the property was then put back on the market.

Legacy

After Valentino's death, many of his films were reissued to help pay his estate expenses. Many were reissued well into the 1930s, long after the demise of silent film. Several books were written, including one by Rambova. A photo montage print showed Valentino arriving in Heaven and being greeted by Enrico Caruso.

Over the years, a "woman in black" carrying a red rose has come to mourn at Valentino's crypt, usually on the anniversary of his death. Several myths surround the woman, though it seems the first woman in black was actually a publicity stunt cooked up by press agent Russel Birdwell in 1928. A woman named Ditra Flame claimed to be the original "woman in black". Several copycats have followed over the years. Although originally a PR stunt, it has become a tradition. The current "woman in black" is motion picture historian Karie Bible. This myth of "woman in black" was also a source of inspiration for the song "Long Black Veil".

Valentino's hometown of Castellaneta, Italy, has created several services in his honor. The Museo Rodolfo Valentino was opened in his childhood home and a memorial designed by architect Nicola Cantore with a blue ceramic statue of Valentino by Luigi Gheno was unveiled in 1961. 
The dedication of the memorial is the subject of a vignette in the documentary Mondo Cane. Fondazione Rodolfo Valentino was created to promote his life and his work. In 2009, a film school was also opened in his hometown, Centro Studi Cine Club Rodolfo Valentino Castellaneta. At the 1995 centennial of his birth, several events were held in his honor. From 1972 to 2006, an Italian acting award—The Rudolph Valentino Award—was handed out every year. Several actors from all over the world received this award, including Leonardo DiCaprio and Elizabeth Taylor.

In 1994, an opera by Dominick Argento (libretto by Charles Nolte) entitled The Dream of Valentino was premiered by the Washington National Opera in the District of Columbia . Reviews were not enthusiastic. The opera was revived by the Minnesota Opera in 2014, with similar reviews.

In Italy in 2006, a one-off film festival was planned to celebrate the opening of the Museo Rodolfo Valentino. In May 2010, the American Society held the Rudolph Valentino Film Festival in Los Angeles, California.

Valentino's syndrome, the type of medically emergent abdominal pain that caused his death, is named after him. Hollywood High School's mascot, the Sheiks, is a tribute to a Valentino character.

Italian fashion designer Valentino is named after him.

Films

The life of Rudolph Valentino has been filmed several times for television and the big screen. One of these biopics is Ken Russell's 1977 film Valentino, in which he is portrayed by Rudolf Nureyev.

An earlier feature film about Valentino's life, also called Valentino, was released in 1951, starring Anthony Dexter in the title role. Dexter bore a striking resemblance to the screen legend.

In 1975, ABC produced the television movie The Legend of Valentino, with Franco Nero as Valentino.

Actor Oliver Clark makes a cameo in the 1971 film They Might Be Giants as a nonverbal psychiatric patient nicknamed Mr. Small, who is under the delusion that he is Valentino and refuses to speak until recognized. His delusion is quickly deduced by the main character, who is himself under the delusion that he is Sherlock Holmes.

Valentino is played by actor/director Alex Monty Canawati in the motion picture Return to Babylon (2013).

Valentino was played by Gene Wilder in the 1977 spoof comedy The World's Greatest Lover.

In 1986, the French TV channel FR3 produced the television movie Série portrait, Rudolph Valentino, with Frédéric Norbert as Valentino.

In his own lifetime, he was referenced in the film Mud and Sand, a parody of Blood and Sand, which starred Stan Laurel as a bullfighter named Rhubarb Vaseline.

Valentino is a supporting character in the fifth season of the horror anthology series American Horror Story. In the series, Valentino, who is played by Finn Wittrock, fakes his own death in 1926 after being transformed into a vampire. Valentino then turns his fictional lover, Elizabeth Johnson (Lady Gaga), into a vampire, as well. Elizabeth goes on to become the Countess, the central antagonist of the show's fifth season, while Valentino is eventually killed by Donovan (Matt Bomer), one of Elizabeth's many lovers, in a jealous rage.

Vladislav Kozlov will play Valentino in his upcoming indie biopic Silent Life, while Franco Nero will play Valentino's spirit.

Music

Shortly after his death, several songs in tribute to Valentino, including "There's a New Star in Heaven Tonight" and one by his first wife, Jean Acker, titled "We Will Meet at the End of the Trail", became bestsellers. In 1964, Freddie Hart recorded a ballad titled "Valentino".

Valentino is mentioned in the following songs:
 "Farewell, Angelina", written and recorded by Bob Dylan in 1965 but not released until 1991; best known from the 1965 recording by Joan Baez
 "Miranda", written and performed by Phil Ochs in 1967 and later recorded by Melanie Safka in 1976
 "Celluloid Heroes", written by Ray Davies and performed by The Kinks in 1972
 "Right Before Your Eyes", written and performed by Ian Thomas in 1977 and later recorded by America in 1982
 "Valentino", written by Shimrit Or and performed by Gali Atari in 1978.
 "Tribute to Tino", written and performed by Dutch-Indonesian new-wave singer Taco for his album After Eight in 1982
 Flagra written and performed by Rita Lee 1982
 "Don't Look Down", written and performed by Iggy Pop in 1979 and later recorded by David Bowie in 1984
 "Waiting for an Alibi," written by Phil Lynott and performed by Thin Lizzy in 1979
 "Apache Dancing", written by Richard Barone and James Mastro and performed by The Bongos in 1985.
 "Manic Monday," written by Prince and performed by The Bangles in 1986
"Valentino Song performed by Spanish band Cadilac in Eurovision song contest 1986. 
 "Big Guns," written and performed by Skid Row in 1989
 "Thank God I Found You (Remix)", performed by Mariah Carey, Joe, and Nas and produced by DJ Clue? in 1999
 "Long Tall Glasses (I Can Dance) ", written by Leo Sayer and David Courtney and performed by Leo Sayer in 1974
 "Y Viva España" by Sylvia, 1974
 "Baby I’m Scared of You", from the album Love Wars, written by Cecil Womack and Linda Womack and performed by Womack & Womack in 1984
 "Rudi" by Bebi Dol, Yugoslavia (Serbia) in 1983
 "Good Old-Fashioned Lover Boy", from the 1976 album A Day at the Races, written by Freddie Mercury, and performed by Queen.
 "Dolly 25", written by Ricet Barrier and performed by Les Frères Jacques in 1958
 "Heartbreak Kid", performed by Icehouse on the Man of Colours album, 1987
 "Unlock It," performed by Charli XCX featuring Kim Petras and Jay Park on the Pop 2 mixtape,  2017
 "Mr. Valentino," written and performed by Stanley Bad, 2020
 Prince Charming's music video briefly has Adam Ant singing the song's refrain ("Prince Charming, Prince Charming, ridicule is nothing to be scared of") as Valentino in The Sheik.
"Valentino" was on Melanie Harrold's first LP ("Fancy That" released 1979 under the pseudonym "Joanna Carlin").

Filmography

References
Citations

Bibliography

 Valentino, Rudolph (1923). Day Dreams. McFadden Publications.
 Valentino, Rudolph (1923). How You Can Keep Fit. McFadden Publications.
 Valentino, Rudolph (1929). My Private Diary. Occult Publishing Company.

External links

 
 
 
 
 
 Collected Works of Rudolph Valentino available for free download at Internet Archive (*the only known recordings of his voice)
 Rambova, Natacha. Rudy: An Intimate Portrait of Rudolph Valentino by His Wife Natacha Rambova. London: Hutchinson & Co., 1926.

 
1895 births
1926 deaths
20th-century Italian male actors
Burials at Hollywood Forever Cemetery
Deaths from peritonitis
French emigrants to the United States
Italian emigrants to the United States
Italian male film actors
Italian male silent film actors
Italian people of French descent
Italian Roman Catholics
French Roman Catholics
Paramount Pictures contract players
People from Bayside, Queens
People from the Province of Taranto